The Joseph Cleale House is a historic house located in Sherborn, Massachusetts.

Description and history 
It is a -story wood-frame house, with a front-facing gable roof, clapboard siding, and twin interior chimneys. A two-story hip-roofed ell extends to the rear of the main block. The house was built c. 1820–25, and is one of the town's best-preserved transitional Federal/Greek Revival houses. Its twin recessed porches are a distinctive feature not found in any older houses, as are the Gothic-looking window caps on the main block.

The house was listed on the National Register of Historic Places in 1986.

See also
National Register of Historic Places listings in Sherborn, Massachusetts

References

Houses on the National Register of Historic Places in Middlesex County, Massachusetts
Houses in Sherborn, Massachusetts
Greek Revival architecture in Massachusetts
Federal architecture in Massachusetts